Clyde Edward Austin (born November 1, 1957) is an American former basketball player. Nicknamed "Clyde the Glide", he emerged as a prospect while playing for Maggie L. Walker High School in Richmond, Virginia, where he is considered one of the area's greatest high school basketball players. Austin played college basketball for the NC State Wolfpack and was an honorable mention All-American during his sophomore season. He was selected by the Philadelphia 76ers as the 44th overall pick in the 1980 NBA draft but never played in the National Basketball Association (NBA).

Austin played for the Philadelphia Kings of the Continental Basketball Association for 13 games in 1980. He then joined the Harlem Globetrotters for eight years. After his retirement from playing, Austin became a pastor and founded the Raleigh Cougars of the United States Basketball League (USBL) in 1997. The team was disestablished mid-season in 1999 following his unexplained absence from the team. In 2004, Austin was sentenced to 17 years in prison for running a national pyramid scheme in which he stole $16 million from his investors between 1996 and 2000. He swindled the money while serving as a pastor and convinced his victims, including seminar attendees, to invest their money in bonds, overseas trading, real estate and the marketing of products including herbs and weight-loss aids.

Austin received an early release from prison and was working at the University of Nevada-Las Vegas as of 2017.

Career statistics

College

|-
| style="text-align:left;"| 1976–77
| style="text-align:left;"| NC State
| 28 || – || – || .485 || – || .738 || 2.5 || 5.0 || 1.9 || .5 || 12.2
|-
| style="text-align:left;"| 1977–78
| style="text-align:left;"| NC State
| 29 || – || – || .457 || – || .664 || 3.5 || 4.2 || 1.4 || .4 || 12.4
|-
| style="text-align:left;"| 1978–79
| style="text-align:left;"| NC State
| 30 || – || – || .488 || – || .699 || 3.2 || 4.0 || 1.2 || .3 || 14.4
|-
| style="text-align:left;"| 1979–80
| style="text-align:left;"| NC State
| 28 || – || – || .511 || – || .700 || 2.6 || 3.3 || 1.0 || .1 || 8.9
|- class="sortbottom"
| style="text-align:center;" colspan="2"| Career
| 115 || – || – || .483 || – || .696 || 3.0 || 4.1 || 1.4 || .3 || 12.0

References

External links
College statistics

1957 births
Living people
20th-century American criminals
African-American basketball players
American male criminals
American men's basketball players
American people convicted of fraud
American sportspeople convicted of crimes
Harlem Globetrotters players
NC State Wolfpack men's basketball players
Philadelphia 76ers draft picks
Point guards
Pyramid and Ponzi schemes
Basketball players from Raleigh, North Carolina